The Senior men's race at the 1991 IAAF World Cross Country Championships was held in Antwerp, Belgium, at the Linkeroever Racecourse on March 24, 1991.   A report on the event was given in The New York Times.

Complete results, medallists, 
 and the results of British athletes were published.

Race results

Senior men's race (11.764 km)

Individual

†: Athlete marked in the results list as nonscorer.

Teams

Note: Athletes in parentheses did not score for the team result

Participation
An unofficial count yields the participation of 237 athletes from 44 countries in the Senior men's race.  This is in agreement with the official numbers as published.

 (1)
 (6)
 (1)
 (9)
 (9)
 (3)
 (8)
 (1)
 (9)
 (1)
 (3)
 (3)
 (8)
 (2)
 (8)
 (9)
 (1)
 (1)
 (6)
 (3)
 (7)
 (9)
 (4)
 (12)
 (1)
 (8)
 (6)
 (7)
 (1)
 (8)
 (9)
 (7)
 (9)
 (1)
 (9)
 (9)
 (1)
 (6)
 (2)
 (9)
 (9)
 (1)
 (5)
 (5)

See also
 1991 IAAF World Cross Country Championships – Junior men's race
 1991 IAAF World Cross Country Championships – Senior women's race
 1991 IAAF World Cross Country Championships – Junior women's race

References

IAAF World Cross Country Championships
Senior men's race at the World Athletics Cross Country Championships